Day Is Done is an autobiographical fiction film by Swiss director Thomas Imbach. The film was first shown at the Berlinale 2011. Day is Done combines answering machine messages with the view out of Imbach's studio over a period of 15 years, creating a fictive life story of the figure “T”, formed by the biographical material of the director. Day is Done was part of different international festivals, such as Planete + Doc Film Warsaw in Mai 2011, the Jerusalem Film Festival in July 2011, the Melbourne International Film Festival, the Japanese Yamagata International Documentary Film Festival or the Chicago International Film Festival in October 2011. He won the Zurich Film Award 2011 and the Swiss Film Award, "Quartz“ for Best Music as well as the "Honorable Mention” of the “Millenium Award Jury“ of the Planete+Doc Festival.

Plot 
The film tells the story of a middle-aged Swiss man named Rolf who returns to his hometown after a long absence to attend his father's funeral. As he reconnects with his past and tries to come to terms with his father's death, Rolf is forced to confront unresolved issues from his childhood and grapple with the challenges of growing older.

Reception

The film received positive reviews from critics for its thoughtful exploration of themes such as memory, identity, and family. The film also won several awards, including the Swiss Film Prize for Best Fiction Film and the Prix du Canton de Vaud at the 2011 Locarno International Film Festival;

“Day Is Done becomes, among other things, a poetic but also wryly humorous study of the selfish artist trying to play the indifferent God, but ending up revealing himself as all too human. (…) Day Is Done contains images of ravishing though unconventional urban beauty.” 

“In his film Thomas Imbach looks out of his window - and sees the world. An evocative maelstrom of great power emerges in the course of nearly two hours.” 

“Thomas Imbachʼs Day is Done answers its questions in large-format, brilliantly, persuasively, humorously, gently and, above all, cinematically. Itʼs an autobiographical movie, a documentary about Zurich; itʼs a study of the weather in Switzerland; itʼs a love letter to the answering machine - itʼs simply marvelous.” 

“A captivating movie of tantalizing visual appeal that transcends the personal and embraces the universal flow of time.” 

“Thomas Imbach has set the world on fire in Day Is Done; constantly shifting between closeness and distance, his personal approach transforms the banalities of everyday life into a larger-than-life picture of his protagonist.” 

“Thomas Imbach, movie designer’ of urban and unconventional beauty has hypnotized the sophisticated and demanding audiences of this yearʼs Berlinale with his film Day Is Done. An avant-garde film whose pleasure lies in discovering the deeper sense that lies in the audiovisual banality of every day.” 

“The film, of a touching lyricism (supported by the wonderful versions of Bob Dylan, Syd Barrett and John Frusciante, among others) is also visceral (Imbach is pretty merciless with himself) and fascinating. One of the big films of this yearʼs BAFICI.”

“Day Is Done is an eerie film of a very particular cinematography and emotionality. A not common experience of denudation makes this film memorable.”

References

External links
 Official film website
 Day Is Done on imdb

2011 films
Swiss drama films
2010s German-language films